A rover was a position in ice hockey used in the late nineteenth and early twentieth century. At the time ice hockey consisted of seven positions: the rover, along with the goaltender, two defencemen, and three forwards; the other positions still remain. Unlike the others, the rover did not have a set position, and roamed the ice at will, going where needed, much as a midfielder in association football might.

As the skill level of players increased, the need to have a rover decreased. Shortly after it was formed in 1910, the National Hockey Association decided to exclude the rover. The league's successor, the NHL, did the same in 1917. However, the Pacific Coast Hockey Association, formed in 1911, kept the rover. The Western Canada Hockey League also used a rover when it was founded in 1921.

As the NHA and later NHL did not have a rover, but the PCHA did, a compromise was made during Stanley Cup matches, which, at the time, was a challenge cup. Games would alternate between the NHA/NHL rules and PCHA versions, allowing each team an advantage and disadvantage during games.

The first Olympic ice hockey tournament in 1920 used a rover, but this position was eliminated for subsequent games.

In 1923, both the PCHA and the WCHL decided to drop the rover position, as it was seen to be crowding the ice and therefore reducing the speed of play. With the decision to remove the rover, it disappeared from professional hockey forever.

Contemporary usage
The term is sometimes used to informally describe fast, rushing offensive defencemen, such as former NHL star Scott Niedermayer, as they often roam the ice creating offensive pressure instead of being simply "blueliners". Other players who have been described as modern "rovers" include Tyson Barrie, Brent Burns, Dustin Byfuglien, Erik Karlsson, Paul Coffey, Cale Makar and Roman Josi, due to their ability to either play forward and defense, or because of their strong puck handling skills. The term is also used to describe the extra attacker, who roams the ice instead of assuming one of the usual positions.

References

Notes

Bibliography

External links

 Rovers inducted in the HHOF

Ice hockey rules
Ice hockey positions